The Dr. Samuel D. Risley House, also known as the Elton B. Gifford House, is a historic home located in Media, Delaware County, Pennsylvania. It was built in 1877.

History and architectural features
This residence, which was built in 1877, is a two-and-one-half story, gray stone house. Designed in the Gothic Revival style, it has a slate-covered intersecting gable roof, and features a verandah and conservatory.  

The house was converted to apartments prior to 1967.

It was added to the National Register of Historic Places in 1990.

Gallery

References

Houses on the National Register of Historic Places in Pennsylvania
Gothic Revival architecture in Pennsylvania
Houses completed in 1877
Houses in Delaware County, Pennsylvania
National Register of Historic Places in Delaware County, Pennsylvania
1877 establishments in Pennsylvania